Radosław "Radek" Szagański (born 17 October 1979) is a Polish-Irish professional darts player who plays in Professional Darts Corporation (PDC) events. He is a first and only Poznań Open Champion and Polish Champion.

Career
Szagański appeared independently from 2008 at various events, primarily in Poland and Republic of Ireland where he live. He reached semi-finals of the Limerick Classic. His first attempt to qualify for the BDO World Darts Championship in 2010 was not crowned with success. In October 2010, he qualified for the 2010 Winmau World Masters, when he won the first round match 3–1 in sets against Chris Scutt. In the second round he lost 1–3 in sets to Andy Boulton.

In August 2011, he played at the Poznań Open which his first and only international trophy of World Darts Federation. In the final he defeat Oto Zmelík. Good form influenced the results in the 2011 Winmau World Masters. On the first day of the competition, he defeated Loris Polese, Craig Robertson, Lee Whitworth and Jim Withers. In the fifth round he lost to Christian Kist 1–3 in sets. In the following years, Szagański's results at the World Masters differed from previous years. In the 2012 Winmau World Masters he lost to Harry Todman in his first match. In the 2013 Winmau World Masters he beat Cor Dekker in preliminary round, but lost to Gary Harding in the first round.

In 2013, he became the Polish Champion, defeat Tomasz Mikołajczyk in the final. The years that followed did not go so well. In 2014, he was able to reach the quarter-finals of the Police Masters and also trying to qualifying for the PDC World Darts Championship. He reached the final of the Irish Tom Kirby Memorial, where the victory in this tournament guaranteed qualified to PDC World Darts Championship. Unfortunately, he lost 2–6 in legs to Daryl Gurney. He was just as close to the qualifying in 2016, when he lost 5–6 in legs to Mick McGowan.

After a few years of break in activity at the international level, Szagański successfully gain a two-year PDC Tour Card in 2022 European Q-School by finishing sixth on the European Q-School Order of Merit. In his debut on PDC European Tour stage in April at the 2022 Austrian Darts Open, he lost 1–6 to Danny Jansen in the first round. A month later he played at the 2022 European Darts Grand Prix, he lost 1–6 to Mickey Mansell in the first round. In June, he was close to his first victory in the PDC European Tour tournament at the 2022 European Darts Matchplay, but he lost 5–6 to Scott Williams in the first round.

Performance timeline

PDC European Tour

References

External links

1979 births
Living people
Professional Darts Corporation current tour card holders
People from Poznań
Polish darts players